Gandhipuram flyover also known as Gandhipuram Tier 1,2 flyover is a two-tier flyover in Gandhipuram.

Timeline

2010: Tamilnadu Government under DMK announces a three-tier flyover at Gandhipuram
2014: Tamilnadu Government laid foundation for the tier-1, 2 flyovers
2018: CM inaugurated tier-1 flyover
2019: CM inaugurated tier-2 flyover 
2020: Tamilnadu Government plans to add ramps to tier-1 flyover

Planning

Tier-1 flyover
The tier-1 flyover begins near the Park Gate roundana near the Coimbatore Central Jail and ends near the Coimbatore Omni Bus Terminus at Sathy Road. The flyover is 2.5 km long and has four lanes.

Tier-2 flyover
The tier-2 flyover begins near the Karpagam Cinemas in the 100 feet Road and ends near the Avarampalayam signal. The flyover is 2 km long and has two lanes.

Future
The Coimbatore Municipal Corporation have proposed to construct ramps towards Bharathiyar road and 100 feet road from the Tier-1 flyover.

See also
 Avinashi Road flyover
 Flyovers in Coimbatore
 Ondipudur Flyover
 Trichy Road Flyover
 Ukkadam Flyover

References

Bridges in Tamil Nadu
Flyovers in Coimbatore